The Early Years is a double CD compilation album released in 2003 by David Coverdale of Deep Purple and Whitesnake, not to be confused with the Whitesnake compilation album The Early Years released in 2004.
It contains his first two solo releases, White Snake, and Northwinds, released in 1977 and 1978, respectively. Both albums retain the bonus tracks found on the Spitfire reissues from 2000.

Track listing
All songs written by David Coverdale and Micky Moody, except where indicated.

Disc one

White Snake
"Lady" - 3:48
"Blindman" (Coverdale) - 6:01
"Goldies Place" (Coverdale) - 5:03
"Whitesnake" - 4:22
"Time on My Side" - 4:26
"Peace Lovin' Man" (Coverdale) - 4:53
"Sunny Days" (Coverdale) - 3:31
"Hole in the Sky" (Coverdale) - 3:23
"Celebration" - 4:11
"Peace Lovin' Man" (Take 1) – 5:04
"Sunny Days" (Take 1) – 3:21

Disc two

Northwinds
"Keep on Giving Me Love" - 5:16
"Northwinds" (Coverdale) - 6:13
"Give Me Kindness" (Coverdale) - 4:34
"Time and Again" (Coverdale) - 4:02
"Queen of Hearts" - 5:16
"Only My Soul" (Coverdale) - 4:36
"Say You Love Me" (Coverdale) - 4:21
"Breakdown" - 5:15
"Shame the Devil" (Coverdale) - 3:35
"Sweet Mistreater" (Coverdale) - 3:45

Personnel

White Snake
David Coverdale - lead vocals
Micky Moody - guitars, backing vocals
Simon Phillips - drums, percussion
De Lisle Harper - bass
Tim Hinkley - keyboards, backing vocals
Ron Aspery - saxophone, flute
Roger Glover - synthesizer, production
Liza Strike - backing vocals
Helen Chappelle - backing vocals
Barry St. John - backing vocals

Northwinds
David Coverdale - lead vocals
Micky Moody - guitars, backing vocals
Tony Newman - drums, percussion
Alan Spenner - bass
Tim Hinkley - keyboards, backing vocals
Roger Glover - synthesizer, production
Ronnie James Dio - backing vocals on "Give Me Kindness"
Wendy Dio - backing vocals on "Give Me Kindness"

References

David Coverdale albums
2003 compilation albums
Hard rock compilation albums
Blues rock compilation albums
Roger Glover albums